Linville Falls is an unincorporated community at the junction of Avery, Burke, and McDowell counties in the U.S. state of North Carolina.  The community is named after Linville Falls, a nearby waterfall in the Linville Gorge Wilderness.

Attractions 
Linville Falls is close to many of western North Carolina's outdoor attractions.
 Blue Ridge Parkway
 Linville Falls
 Linville Gorge Wilderness
 Linville Caverns

The Linville Falls Tavern was listed on the National Register of Historic Places in 2000 and the Franklin-Penland House in 2006.

See also
 Linville River

References

Unincorporated communities in Avery County, North Carolina
Unincorporated communities in Burke County, North Carolina
Unincorporated communities in McDowell County, North Carolina